Barceló is the name and brand of a variety of rums from the Dominican Republic produced by Ron Barceló S.R.L. Barceló has its plant and distillery in San Pedro de Macorís.

Company history

Following his dream of devising the best rum in the world, in 1929, a young Julián Barceló from Spain arrived in Santo Domingo and founded Barceló & Co. Soon he began producing one of his first rums and selling it throughout the country.

The optimum product was obtained by experimenting with different brands on the local market, and in 1950, the Ron Barceló brand was launched with the products Barceló Blanco and Dorado (white and gold rums respectively), which were an immediate success. Some 20 years later, Ron Barceló Añejo (a mature rum), was added to the portfolio.

In 1974, Don Julián Barceló handed over the reins of the business to his nephew Miguel Barceló and 6 years later, in 1980 Ron Barceló Imperial was born, premium emblematic rum, leader in its class since the day it was launched and the most internationally awarded Dominican rum.

With the idea of expanding the brand, in the 90s Barceló & Co. gave a group of Spanish businessmen, with a long history of producing wines and spirits, the rights to export Ron Barceló. These entrepreneurs founded Ron Barceló SRL.. In 2006, by then sold on 25 international markets, Ron Barceló SRL. took over Ron Barceló completely, with the third generation Barceló's, namely the Barceló Díaz and Garcia families, remaining on the Board of Directors.

That same year the bottles for Ron Barceló Imperial, Gran Añejo and Añejo were redesigned and a new era began.

Nowadays, Ron Barceló SRL. still produces only Ron Barceló, which is sold in over 50 countries, ranking it the 4th largest exporter of rum in the world.

Rum elaboration plant
Developed in San Pedro de Macorís, in the east of the Dominican Republic, are built several plants for alcohol aging, elaboration, bottling, storage of packaged and finished products, a laboratory, sensory evaluation, amongst others.

Products

Barceló Cream (Añejo rum with cream)
Barceló Dorado (golden aged low-tier)
Barceló Blanco (white aged mid-tier)
Barceló Añejo (golden aged mid-tier)
Barceló Gran Añejo (golden aged premium)
Barceló Gran Platinum (white aged premium)
Barceló Imperial (golden high-end premium)
Barceló Imperial Premium Blend 30 Aniversario (Golden Ultra Premium)

References

Rums
Alcoholic drink brands
Brands of the Dominican Republic
Drink companies of the Dominican Republic
Food and drink companies established in 1930
1930 in the Dominican Republic
1930 establishments in the Dominican Republic